Jacques Vernier (21 July 1923 – 14 April 2015) was a French long-distance runner who competed in the 1948 Summer Olympics. He was the twin brother of fellow Olympic athlete Jean Vernier.

References

1923 births
2015 deaths
French male long-distance runners
Olympic athletes of France
Athletes (track and field) at the 1948 Summer Olympics